D’X-Man (short for The Ex-Manalista) is a 30 minute expository-religious program emanating from the Philippines. It was conceptualized by Bro. Eli Soriano and Kuya Daniel Razon, Overall Servants of the Members Church of God International, Everynight at 11:30 PM.

Counterprogram

As the program criticizes the Iglesia ni Cristo doctrines, the Iglesia ni Cristo launched their own programs Ang Tamang Daan on June 11, 2001, and Ang Mga Nagsialis sa Samahang Ang Dating Daan, in 2006, featuring former MCGI-turned INC members. These counter programs criticize the doctrines of the Members Church of God International, their church and its leader.

Mataro's death
On April 27, 2008, Bro. Marcos Mataro, who was then the host of this show, was shot dead by two unknown assailants in San Simon, Pampanga. MCGI members have accused the INC of being behind the murder as Mataro's TV program, D'X-Man (short for The Ex-Manalista), was critical of the Iglesia ni Cristo doctrines. Murder charges were filed against the principal suspects in the killing. Nickson Icao and Felizardo "Ka Zaldy" Lumagham, both of Macabebe, Pampanga and who claim to be members of INC, were charged before the San Fernando prosecutors office.

Hosts
Current hosts
 Bro. Arnel 
 Sis. Nedie Espanol 
 Sis. Jane 
 Sis. Jayrell De Jesus 
 Bro. Matthew Gulle 
 Bro. Ladie Sibug 
 Bro. Larry Erfilo 
 Sis. Lydia Manuyag 
 Bro. Cesar Adamos 

Former host
 Bro. Marcos Mataro† 
 Bro. Manny Jusay†

Awards

References

Philippine religious television series
Members Church of God International
UNTV (Philippines) original programming
2004 Philippine television series debuts
Filipino-language television shows